Alex Pringle (born 8 November 1948) is a Scottish former professional footballer who played as a defender. Active in Scotland and the United States, Pringle made over 100 appearances in a 10-year career.

Career
Born in Edinburgh, Pringle played professionally in Scotland and the United States for Glasgow United, Hibernian, Dundee, Clyde, the Tampa Bay Rowdies, the Washington Diplomats and the New Jersey Americans. While in Tampa he also served as the head coach of the University of Tampa men's soccer team in 1975 and 1976. In two seasons, he compiled a record of 11 wins 15 losses and 1 draw.

References

1948 births
Association football fullbacks
Clyde F.C. players
Dundee F.C. players
Expatriate soccer players in the United States
Hibernian F.C. players
Living people
North American Soccer League (1968–1984) indoor players
North American Soccer League (1968–1984) players
Scottish expatriate footballers
Scottish expatriate sportspeople in the United States
Scottish Football League players
Scottish footballers
Footballers from Edinburgh
Tampa Bay Rowdies (1975–1993) players
Washington Diplomats (NASL) players